Seoul National University Station is a station on Seoul Subway Line 2, located in Bongcheon-dong, Gwanak-gu of southern Seoul. This station is also known as Gwanak-gu Office Station. There are eight exits, two at each corner of the crossroads – of Nambu Beltway (Nambusunhwan-ro) and Gwanak-ro – where the station lies beneath.

Seoul National University Station has one curved island platform, which is wide in the middle and narrow at both ends. The platform screen doors were installed for both tracks by 2006. Escalators are available between the platform and the waiting/ticketing area.

In The Amazing Race 4, teams had to find this station (which was labeled only as Station 228) to obtain the next route marker.

Station layout

Vicinity
Exit 1 : Hana Bank
Exit 4 : Gwanak District Office
Exit 5 : Geunhwa Hospital
Exit 6 : Bongcheon Central Market
Exit 7 : Bongwon Middle School
Exit 8 : Wondang Elementary School, Korea Post Office,  Korea Exchange Bank

References

Metro stations in Gwanak District
Seoul Metropolitan Subway stations
Railway stations opened in 1983
Seoul National University
1983 establishments in South Korea
20th-century architecture in South Korea